Sarah Ann McMurray ( Silcock, 26 August 1848 – 14 September 1943) was a New Zealand woodcarver and craftswoman.

Biography
McMurray was born in Nelson, New Zealand, on 26 August 1848, the daughter of Susannah Silcock (née Flower) and Captain Simon Bonnet Silcock. McMurray was the third of 14 children.

She married Robert McMurray in 1872. They had six children. They lived for some time in dense forest in the Inangahua Valley on the West Coast of the South Island. In the 1880s they moved to a farm in Awahuri in the North Island. Later moving again to Wanganui.

She took up relief carving as a hobby and despite being over 50 years old she enrolled in the Wanganui Technical College. She elaborately carved most of the furnishings in her house. 

She was among the signatories to New Zealand's 1893 women's suffrage petition. In 1914 her and husband Robert McMurray moved to Palmerston North. Robert McMurray died in 1927.  She continued her woodcarving in Palmerston North working in the garden shed. She worked mainly in kauri. She also handmade toys for her children and grandchildren one of which is in the Museum of New Zealand Te Papa Tongarewa.

Death
McMurray died at her home on Ada Street in Palmerston North on 14 September 1943, aged 95.  She is buried at Terrace End Cemetery in Palmerston North.

References

External links
 Photographs of Robert and Sarah Ann McMurray, Manawatu Heritage

New Zealand woodcarvers
1848 births
1943 deaths
19th-century New Zealand women artists
19th-century New Zealand artists
People from Palmerston North
People from Nelson, New Zealand
People from Whanganui
Women woodcarvers
20th-century New Zealand women artists
Burials at Terrace End Cemetery